Criorhina verbosa ( Walker, 1849 ), the Hairy-cheeked Bumble Fly, is an uncommon species of syrphid fly observed in the eastern to central  northeastern United States. Hoverflies can remain nearly motionless in flight. The adults are also known as flower flies for they are commonly found on flowers, from which they get both energy-giving nectar and protein-rich pollen. The larvae of this genus are found in decaying wood.

Distribution
Canada, United States.

References

Eristalinae
Diptera of North America
Hoverflies of North America
Taxa named by Francis Walker (entomologist)
Insects described in 1849